The New Ireland forest rat (Rattus sanila) is a large rodent in the family Muridae. It is endemic to New Ireland, in the Bismarck Archipelago, Papua New Guinea.

Description
Ratus sanila is known only by the discovery of some 7 subfossil fragments of jaw dated to over 3000 years old. The molars of this particular species are broad and have a very complex structure of the cusp. The diastema is also longer than in other species of the genus Rattus suggesting a separate species which may be a relict of an archaic or ancestral dispersal of Rattus stock to New Guinea and Australia. This species probably still survives in some primary forest.

References

External links
http://thewebsiteofeverything.com/animals/mammals/Rodentia/Muridae/Rattus/Rattus-sanila.html
Bucknell
http://www.itis.gov/servlet/SingleRpt/SingleRpt?search_topic=TSN&search_value=585548

Rattus
Rodents of Papua New Guinea
Rodents of Australia
Mammals described in 1991